Jordyn Ashley Poulter (born July 31, 1997) is an American volleyball player for the United States women's national volleyball team. Poulter played collegiate volleyball with the University of Illinois Fighting Illini from 2015 to 2018. Poulter won gold with the national team at the 2020 Tokyo Summer Olympics.

Early life

Poulter was born in Naperville, Illinois and grew up in Aurora, Colorado, attending Eaglecrest High School. She was the overall No. 3 nationally (and top setter) ranked recruit coming out of high school and won several state and national awards, including the Andi Collins award for the best setter in the country. She totaled 2,529 assists, 716 kills, 664 digs, 385 blocks and 208 aces over 101 high school matches.

Career

University of Illinois

Poulter was recruited by several top college volleyball teams, with her final two choices being UCLA and Illinois, ultimately committing to Illinois between her freshman and sophomore years in high school. She was a two-time All-American and was named the Big Ten Setter of the Year during her senior season, and led Illinois to a Final Four appearance.

Professional and US National Team

She currently plays professionally for Italian Series A1 (Italy's top professional league) club volleyball team, Igor Gorgonzola Novara.

She began training with the senior US National Team in the summer of 2018, while she was still in college. She was part of the team that won a gold medal in the 2019 FIVB Volleyball Women's Nations League tournament, as well as the 2019 Women's Pan-American Volleyball Cup. In May 2021, she was named to the 18-player roster for the 2021 FIVB Volleyball Women's Nations League. Poulter started the majority of the matches, and USA won the gold medal for the third straight year after defeating Brazil. She was named "Best Setter" at the conclusion of the tournament.

On June 7, 2021, US National Team head coach Karch Kiraly announced she would be part of the 12-player Olympic roster for the 2020 Summer Olympics in Tokyo. After starting all matches, Poulter suffered an ankle injury during the final pool play match against Italy. The injury forced her to miss the quarterfinals versus Dominican Republic, however, USA was able to win the match after fellow setter Micha Hancock came in as a substitute. Poulter successfully returned to lead her team to victories in the semifinals and eventually led Team USA to their first-ever gold medal in women's indoor competition. For her efforts, she was named as the "Best Setter" of the Olympics.

Poulter signed with Igor Gorgonzola Novara for the 2022–2023 professional season as the starting setter, but suffered season-ending ACL, MCL and meniscus injuries in her knee during a match in December 2022.

Individual awards

High school

2011-2014 All-Centennial Conference First Team
2012-2014 Denver Post All-Colorado Volleyball Team
2014 CHSAA Class 5A All-State Player of the Year
2014 Andi Collins Award
2014 MaxPreps All-America
2014 PrepVolleyball.com All-America
2014 Under Armour First-Team All-America

Collegiate

2015 Illinois Female Newcomer of the Year
2015 Big Ten All-Freshman Team
2016 AVCA Honorable Mention All-America
2016 AVCA All-Northeast Region
2016 All-Big Ten
2017 AVCA Third Team All-America
2017 All-Big Ten
2018 Honda Sports Award Nominee
2018 AVCA First Team All-America
2018 Big Ten Setter of the Year (co)
2018 AVCA Northeast Region Player of the Year
2018 All-Big Ten
2018 NCAA Champaign Regional Most Outstanding Player
2018 University of Illinois Athletics Dike Eddleman Female Athlete of the Year

International
2013 World Championships U18 – Best Setter
2013 USA Girls Youth National Team, FIVB U18 World Championships – Best Setter
2014 NORCECA Championship U20 Women's Junior NORCECA Championship – Best Setter
2021 Nations League "Best Setter"
2020 Summer Olympics – "Best Setter"

Personal life
In May 2022, Poulter revealed her gold medal from the 2020 Summer Olympics was stolen out of her vehicle in Anaheim, California. The thief was arrested in early June, and the medal was recovered on June 27, 2022 after the owners of an Anaheim barbershop discovered it on their property and contacted the Anaheim Police Department.

References

1997 births
Living people
American women's volleyball players
Sportspeople from Aurora, Colorado
Sportspeople from Naperville, Illinois
Illinois Fighting Illini women's volleyball players
Setters (volleyball)
Expatriate volleyball players in Italy
American expatriate sportspeople in Italy
Volleyball players at the 2020 Summer Olympics
Olympic gold medalists for the United States in volleyball
Medalists at the 2020 Summer Olympics